Greatest Hits is a 1966 greatest hits album for The Temptations, released by the Gordy (Motown) label.  It peaked at #5 on the Billboard 200 album chart and remained on the chart for 120 weeks.  Included are popular Temptations hits such as "The Way You Do the Things You Do", "Get Ready", "Since I Lost My Baby", "My Baby", "Don't Look Back", and their signature #1 hit, "My Girl". One non-album single, "Beauty Is Only Skin Deep", is also included; it was a #3 hit in the summer and fall of 1966.

The album was included in Robert Christgau's "Basic Record Library" of 1950s and 1960s recordings, published in Christgau's Record Guide: Rock Albums of the Seventies (1981).

Track listing

Side one
"The Way You Do the Things You Do" (Smokey Robinson, Robert Rogers) (lead singer: Eddie Kendricks)
"My Girl" (Robinson, Ronald White) (lead singer: David Ruffin)
"Ain't Too Proud to Beg" (Edward Holland, Jr., Norman Whitfield) (lead singer: David Ruffin)
"Don't Look Back" (Robinson, White) (lead singer: Paul Williams)
"Get Ready" (Robinson) (lead singer: Eddie Kendricks)
"Beauty Is Only Skin Deep" (Holland, Whitfield) (lead singer: David Ruffin)

Side two
"Since I Lost My Baby" (Warren Moore, Robinson) (lead singer: David Ruffin)
"The Girl's Alright with Me" (Holland, Eddie Kendricks, Whitfield) (lead singer: Eddie Kendricks)
"My Baby" (Moore, Robinson, Rogers) (lead singer: David Ruffin)
"It's Growing" (Moore, Robinson) (lead singer: David Ruffin)
"I'll Be in Trouble" (Robinson) (lead singers: Eddie Kendricks, Melvin Franklin)
"Girl (Why You Wanna Make Me Blue)" (Holland, Whitfield) (lead singer: Eddie Kendricks)

Chart and singles history

Singles

Year-end charts

See also
List of number-one R&B albums of 1966 (U.S.)
List of number-one R&B albums of 1967 (U.S.)
 Greatest Hits, Vol. 2

References

Albums produced by Norman Whitfield
Albums produced by Smokey Robinson
1966 greatest hits albums
The Temptations compilation albums
Gordy Records compilation albums
Albums recorded at Hitsville U.S.A.